Tribonanthes purpurea belongs to the genus Tribonanthes in the bloodwort family, Haemodoraceae. It was first described by Macfarlane and Hopper in 1987. It is a perennial herb growing from 0.03 to 0.04 m high, in seasonally wet moss and herbfields among granite rocks.  Its pink to purple flowers are seen in August.

It is found in the IBRA regions: Avon Wheatbelt, Esperance Plains, Jarrah Forest and Mallee.

References

External links

Haemodoraceae
Commelinales of Australia
Angiosperms of Western Australia
Endemic flora of Western Australia
Taxa named by Stephen Hopper
Taxa named by Terry Desmond Macfarlane